Vardyville is a community in Newfoundland and Labrador, Canada located north of Hickman's Harbour and Random Island.

See also
List of communities in Newfoundland and Labrador

Populated coastal places in Canada
Populated places in Newfoundland and Labrador